Dmitry Aleksandrovich Korobov (born 10 June 1994) is a Russian football midfielder who plays for FC Chernomorets Novorossiysk. Born in Vladikavkaz. Sports rank: candidate master of sports. First coach - Shalva Genievich Kerashvili. In 2011, recruited under the banner of the youth national team of Russia. In the year 2000. at the age of six Dima included in the Book of records of Russia. Dima juggled the ball using only the feet and to a greater extent head live for 6 hours in the building of the Ostankino. Member of the European phase of the tournament Nike Premier Cup 2009 Genk Belgium.

Career

Club 
Started playing football in 2000 in the school Vladikavkazkoy "Youth". In 2005 the team "Yunost" (Vladikavkaz) took second place at the Largest Junior tournament "Leather ball" was named best midfielder and became the top scorer in the tournament. In 2006, he continued his football education at the Academy of football of a name of Yury Konoplyov. Became the Champion of Russia among boys born in 1994.In 2012 was declared on the championship Togliatti "Academy". He made his debut in the Russian Second Division for FC Akademiya Tolyatti on 30 May 2012 in a game against FC Nosta Novotroitsk. At this time, the player was to watch FC Siberia, and in the summer he was invited to the show. In December, Dmitry signed a contract with "Novosibirsk" for 1 year, but played for the team Sibiraj-2. After a great season in the second team, Dmitry Korobov took the first team of Novosibirsk, but he refused. Went to Volgograd, even the contract had to sign, but in the end, "Rotor" left FNL. After that, there was an option to "Torch". And 7 July 2014 signed a contract with the Voronezh club for 2 years.

He made his official debut for the first team of "blue-whites" on 12 July 2014, in the PFL game against FC Metallurg Vyksa (2–0), in which he played all 90 minutes, scored a goal and an assist.

He made his Russian Premier League debut for FC Ural Yekaterinburg on 7 March 2016 in a game against FC Dynamo Moscow.

He played in the 2017–18 Russian Cup final for FC Avangard Kursk on 9 May 2018 in the Volgograd Arena against 2-1 winners FC Tosno.

References

External links
 

1994 births
Sportspeople from Vladikavkaz
Living people
Russian footballers
Russia youth international footballers
Russia under-21 international footballers
Association football midfielders
FC Sibir Novosibirsk players
FC Fakel Voronezh players
FC Ural Yekaterinburg players
FC Avangard Kursk players
FC SKA Rostov-on-Don players
FC Chernomorets Novorossiysk players
Russian Premier League players
Russian First League players
Russian Second League players